Pavilion Kuala Lumpur, also known as Pavilion KL, is a shopping centre situated in the Bukit Bintang district in Kuala Lumpur, Malaysia.

History
Pavilion Kuala Lumpur was built on the former site of Bukit Bintang Girls' School, the oldest school in Kuala Lumpur, which was moved to Cheras as Sekolah Seri Bintang Utara in 2000. Opened on 20 September 2007, the development consists of a premier shopping centre, two blocks of serviced apartments, an office block and a 5-star hotel.

On 3 December 2021, it had opened its sister mall, Pavilion Bukit Jalil (Pavilion 2), in the southern suburbs of Kuala Lumpur. A third mall known as Pavilion Damansara Heights will also be opened to the public in mid-2023.

Shopping Precincts
Pavilion Kuala Lumpur consists of eight shopping precincts and a row of street-front boutiques.

Beauty Hall
Spanning , Beauty Hall is an oasis of rest and relaxation for shoppers with a myriad of spas and salons.

Centre Court

Apart from housing Dôme and The Coffee Bean & Tea Leaf, Centre Court is the place where all the large-scale events and promotions happen. Festive celebrations and thematic events such as KL Fashion Week and Waku Waku Japan Festival are all held in this area. The event area once featured the tallest Swarovski Christmas tree in Asia as part of the centre's Christmas celebration.

Connection
Connection is the trendy hub that refreshes patrons with its al-fresco ambience with many restaurants, cafes, dessert places, and coffee shops. Connection is also home to the upcoming Dadi Cinema and Red Box Plus Karaoke.

Couture Pavilion
Located on Levels 2 and 3, Couture Pavilion is dedicated to some of the most renowned fashion labels in the world.

Dining Loft
Located at Level 7, Dining Loft is home to some first-in Malaysia and casual dining restaurants.

Fashion Avenue
Located on Level 2 and Level 3, Fashion Avenue brings together big and popular brands to cater to the fashion forward and trend setters.

Gourmet Emporium
Spanning the entire Level 1, Gourmet Emporium is a food haven that offers a full range of dining choices. Gourmet supermarket Mercato (owned by Cold Storage) anchors the precinct while Singaporean food court chain Food Republic anchors the food atrium. Located nearby the Gourmet Emporium is an underpass to the adjacent Fahrenheit 88.

Tokyo Street

Located on the east end of Level 6, Tokyo Street is a Japanese-themed precinct merging traditional and modern elements of Japan under one roof. It houses Daiso, established Japanese restaurants and snack brands, Japanese art stores, and Japan-themed souvenir shops.

Pavilion Elite
Pavilion Elite is the retail expansion of Pavilion KL and is built adjacent to the centre. It opened its doors to the public on the 29th of November 2016. Pavilion Elite has a net lettable area of 250,000 sq ft (land area around 1.29 acres) spanning ten floors. The retail podium houses the largest Coach store in South-East Asia and the first COS in Malaysia.

Transport

Pavilion Kuala Lumpur is located a short walk away from either of Bukit Bintang MRT/Monorail station from the south or Raja Chulan Monorail station from the north. The centre is also linked to Kuala Lumpur Convention Centre and Suria KLCC (and hence its LRT station) via an elevated pedestrian walkway. The pedestrian walkaway is air-conditioned and is about 1 kilometre long, about 15 to 20 minutes to walk.

See also

 Pavilion Bukit Jalil
 Bukit Bintang
 List of shopping malls in Malaysia

References

External links 
 Pavilion KL's Facebook Page

Shopping malls in Kuala Lumpur
Skyscrapers in Kuala Lumpur
2007 establishments in Malaysia
Shopping malls established in 2007
Skyscraper office buildings in Kuala Lumpur
Residential skyscrapers in Malaysia